Bethany Congregational Church may refer to:

in the United States
(by state)
 Bethany Congregational Church (Thomasville, Georgia), listed on the NRHP in Georgia
 Bethany Congregational Church (West Terre Haute, Indiana), listed on the NRHP in Indiana
 Bethany Congregational Church (Quincy, Massachusetts), listed on the NRHP in Massachusetts